Nicholas Antero "Niko" Hämäläinen (born 5 March 1997) is a professional footballer who plays as a left-back for Belgian club RWDM47 on loan from Queens Park Rangers. Born in the United States, he represents the Finland national team.

Born and raised in the United States, Hämäläinen was eligible to represent Finland through his Finnish father. He represented Finland at various youth levels before making his senior debut against Estonia on 11 January 2019.

Club career

Queens Park Rangers
On 18 September 2014, Hämäläinen signed for Queens Park Rangers from the FC Dallas Academy. Former West Ham midfielder Ian Bishop, a family friend, arranged a trial for Hämäläinen, where he was spotted by QPR.

2015–16: Dagenham & Redbridge loan
On 6 August 2015, Hämäläinen signed on an emergency loan deal at Dagenham & Redbridge until 5 September 2015.

Hämäläinen made his professional debut on 12 August 2015, in Dagenham & Redbridge's 1–4 loss to Charlton Athletic in the League Cup. He was named in the starting eleven and was replaced by Ashley Hemmings in the 58th minute. His loan was extended in September 2015 for an additional month.

Return to QPR
He made his league debut for QPR as a substitute for Joel Lynch in a 2–1 win against West London rivals Fulham on 1 October 2016. He made his first appearance in the starting lineup on 22 October 2016 in a match against Sheffield Wednesday.

2018–19: Los Angeles FC loan
On 25 February 2019, Hämäläinen joined Major League Soccer side Los Angeles FC on a six-month loan deal. Prior to his signing, Jordan Harvey was the only recognised left-back at LAFC. After the announcement of the signing, general manager John Thorrington said “Niko has a bright future ahead of him and we look forward to furthering his professional development at LAFC... I am confident he will prove to be a valuable addition to the group". He made his debut when he came off the bench in the 81st minute and made an assist in the 90+2 minute for the winner in a 2-1 win over Real Salt Lake.

2019–20: Kilmarnock loan
Hämäläinen was loaned to Scottish Premiership club Kilmarnock in August 2019. His decision to move to Scotland was influenced by compatriot Glen Kamara, who plays for Rangers, and Lee Wallace, a teammate of Hämäläinen's at QPR, having joined from Rangers himself in June 2019. So far in 2019–20, Hämäläinen has been named in the Scottish Premiership team of the week twice.

2021: LA Galaxy (loan)
On 6 August 2021, Hämäläinen returned to Major League Soccer and joined LA Galaxy on loan through the end of the 2021 season.

2022: Botafogo FR (loan)
On 12 April 2022, Hämäläinen signed a loan contract for Botafogo FR until July.

2023: RWDM47 (loan)
On 31 January 2023, Hämäläinen was loaned to RWDM47 in the Belgian second-tier Challenger Pro League.

International career
Hämäläinen was eligible for the United States and Finland, having been born and raised in the United States to a Finnish father. He originally played as a youth international for Finland.

He made his senior debut for the Finland national football team on 11 January 2019 at Khalifa International Stadium in Doha, Qatar, in a friendly match against Estonia. He played for 84 minutes until he was replaced by Juha Pirinen.

On 30 August 2019, Hämäläinen accepted a call to the United States under-23s, his first call-up to the United States at any level.

Hämäläinen made his competitive debut for Finland against the Republic of Ireland in the UEFA Nations League on 6 September 2020, thus tying him to the Finnish national team.

Hämäläinen was called up for the UEFA Euro 2020 pre-tournament friendly match against Sweden on 29 May 2021, and later for the tournament itself

Personal life
Hämäläinen was born and raised in the United States. He is of African-American and Finnish descent. He is the son of Timo Hämäläinen, who played for the Finnish football club Koparit in 1978–1982 in the SM-sarja before moving to the United States to work.

Career statistics

Club

International

Honours and achievements

Individual
 Football Association of Finland Promising player of the year: 2015

References

External links
 Queens Park Rangers F.C. official profile
 Niko Hämäläinen – SPL competition record
 
 
 

1997 births
Sportspeople from West Palm Beach, Florida
Soccer players from Florida
African-American soccer players
American people of Finnish descent
Finnish people of African-American descent
21st-century African-American sportspeople
Living people
Association football midfielders
Finnish footballers
Finland youth international footballers
Finland under-21 international footballers
Finland international footballers
American soccer players
FC Dallas players
Queens Park Rangers F.C. players
Dagenham & Redbridge F.C. players
Los Angeles FC players
Kilmarnock F.C. players
LA Galaxy players
Botafogo de Futebol e Regatas players
RWDM47 players
English Football League players
Major League Soccer players
Scottish Professional Football League players
UEFA Euro 2020 players
Finnish expatriate footballers
American expatriate soccer players
Expatriate footballers in England
Finnish expatriate sportspeople in England
American expatriate sportspeople in England
Expatriate footballers in Scotland
Finnish expatriate sportspeople in Scotland
American expatriate sportspeople in Scotland
Expatriate footballers in Brazil
American expatriate sportspeople in Brazil
Finnish expatriate sportspeople in Brazil
Expatriate footballers in Belgium
American expatriate sportspeople in Belgium
Finnish expatriate sportspeople in Belgium